Mouriez is a commune in the Pas-de-Calais department in the Hauts-de-France region of France.

Located in the south of the department, the municipality has a surface area of 1,572 hectares. Its 246 inhabitants (2018) are spread over the town and three hamlets.

A small agricultural village in the southern Artois region, the main town is nestled in the heart of the Seven Valleys pays, the "green lung of the Pas-de-Calais", and in the hollow of one of the valleys in the hinterland of Montreuil, seven kilometers south of the town of Hesdin. This region is particularly renowned for the quality of its agricultural soils.

During the Middle Ages and in Early modern period, this proximity to Hesdin was an opportunity and sometimes a source of misfortune for the surrounding villages. Chance, because the town, thanks to its Drapery activity and its position as a crossroads, became a flourishing city. Misfortune, for the same reasons of wealth and traffic: these lands coveted and successively claimed by many Crowns, serve as a "boulevard" for predatory armies.

From the beginning of the 12th century, the village communities of Mouriez and neighboring parishes developed an almost "symbiotic" relationship with the Premonstratensian community established in the abbey of Dommartin, which gradually became the owner of most of the land on the plateau.

In 1834, the finalisation of the commune expanded while its population grew due to the suppression of the commune of Dommartin, after the disappearance of its abbey. The former territory of Dommartin is divided between the three bordering communes. For two centuries, the commune experienced a demographic decline mainly due to the rural exodus.

Geography

Site and location
Mouriez is located between the Canche and Authie valleys, on the southern foothills of the Artois hills. It is one of the largest in the canton and covers an area of 1,572 hectares. It adjoins the Somme department at the Goulaffre ravine between the Bamières plain and the Dompierre forest.

The village is located at the bottom of a dry valley with a depth varying from 40 to 60 meters and incising an interfluvial plateau.

In addition to the village, the village is composed of three hamlets, two of which are located on the surrounding plateau: Bamières (to the east), and Lambus (to the north) near the national road 39 (RN 39). The hamlet of Rachinette (to the southeast) is nestled in the bottom of the vaux Roux and the Goulaffre.

Topography and hydrography
The valley bottom collects part of the rainwater from the plateau. In the past, the runoff may have caused some major flooding and it contributes to the degradation of several sections of road that run through the commune.

Geological structure, geomorphology and pedology

Climate

Communication and transportation

Population

Places of interest
 The seventeenth century church of the Nativité-de-Notre-Dame.

See also
 Communes of the Pas-de-Calais department

References

External links

 Statistical data, INSEE

Communes of Pas-de-Calais
Pas-de-Calais communes articles needing translation from French Wikipedia
Artois